The 1988 E3 Harelbeke was the 31st edition of the E3 Harelbeke cycle race and was held on 26 March 1988. The race started and finished in Harelbeke. The race was won by Guido Bontempi of the Carrera team.

General classification

References

1988 in Belgian sport
1988